General Rodríguez is a municipality in Argentina. General Rodríguez may also refer to:

Abelardo L. Rodríguez (1889–1967), Mexican general
Antonio Cárdenas Rodríguez (1903–1969), Mexican Air Force divisional general
Cornelio Saavedra Rodríguez (1821–1891), Chilean Army divisional general
David M. Rodriguez (born 1954), U.S. Army four-star general
Guillermo Rodríguez (politician) (born 1924), military dictator of Ecuador 
Martín Rodríguez (politician) (1771–1845), United Provinces of the Río de la Plata brigadier general

See also
José Julio Rodríguez Fernández (born 1948), Spanish Air Force general
Juan Pablo Rodríguez Barragán (born 1956), Colombian Army general
Sunith Francis Rodrigues (born 1933), Indian Army general
Attorney General Rodriguez (disambiguation)